Nataliya Kobrynska (8 June 1851 – 22 January 1920) was a Ukrainian writer, socialist feminist, and activist.

The daughter of Reverend Ivan Ozarkevych, a priest who was later elected to the Austrian Parliament, and Teofilia Okunevska, she was born Nataliya Ozarkevych in the village of Beleluia in the Halychyna province of Galicia. At that time, women were not allowed to pursue education beyond the elementary level and so she was mainly educated at home. She studied several languages: German, French, Polish and Russian and read literature from various counties. In 1871, she married Theofil Kobrynsky. He died a few years later and she was forced to return to Bolekhiv to live with her parents.

Kobrynska went to Vienna with her father, where she met Ivan Franko; Franko encouraged her to take on the task of improving the status of Ukrainian women and to encourage them to seek equality with men. In 1884, she organized the Tovarystvo Rus'kykh Zhinok (Association of Ukrainian Women) to educate women by exposing them to literature and by promoting discussions on women's rights. In 1890, she was part of a delegation that lobbied the Minister of Education to allow women to attend university. She also advocated universal suffrage, day care and communal kitchens.

She wrote her first short story "Shuminska" (later known as The Spirit of the Times, in 1883; the following year, she wrote a novella For a Piece of Bread. In 1887, with Olena Pchilka, she edited Pershy vinok (The First Garland), a collection of writing by Ukrainian women. Kobrynska's publishing house Zhinocha Sprava (Women’s Cause) produced three issues of a women's almanac called Nasha dolya (Our Fate).

She died in Bolekhiv in 1920.

Her work was translated to English for the collections The Spirit of the Times (1998) and Warm the Children, O Sun (1998).

References 

1851 births
1920 deaths
Socialist feminists
Ukrainian women novelists
Ukrainian women short story writers
Ukrainian short story writers
Ukrainian feminists
Ukrainian editors
Ukrainian women editors
Ukrainian publishers (people)
19th-century Ukrainian women writers
20th-century Ukrainian women writers
19th-century Ukrainian writers
20th-century Ukrainian writers